The LNWR 1185 Class was a class of 0-8-2T steam tank locomotives designed by Charles Bowen-Cooke and introduced in 1911.  They passed into LMS ownership in 1923 and 8 survived to British Railways ownership in 1948.  British Railways numbers were 47875-47896 (with gaps).

Career
30 engines, designed under the supervision of C J Bowen-Cooke, and built at Crewe during 1911–1917. Intended for duties formerly needing two locomotives. Essentially a tank version of the G class 0-8-0s. When introduced they had the then new style of 12″ letters for the company's initials on the tank sides. They were fitted with saturated "Precursor" class boilers with lagged ends, round-top fireboxes, and sloping coal bunkers. The main wheels were coupled by three overlapping rods and the third pair of wheels were flangeless. Lever actuated Joy reversing gear appeared in-lieu of the normal Ramsbottom screw system. The earlier engines initially had slender tapered Cooke buffers but these were replaced by those of standard Webb pattern: The latter type was fitted from new on later engines. Braking was by steam, but vacuum brakes were provided to operate fitted or passenger stock if required.	

During the Depression years many of the class spent time in store for want of work and almost half were scrapped. Ten, however, survived to be taken into nationalised stock at the start of 1948.

No.1090, as BR No.47884, achieved the highest calculated service mileage of 732,425 miles. Others ran 715,830 miles (No.47896), 701,005 miles (No.47877), 692,706 miles (No.47881) and 553,433 miles (No.7885).

References

Further reading

External links

 Class 6F-A Details at Rail UK
 Goods Engines of LNWR
 LNWR/LMS Cooke "1185" Class 0-8-2T

1185 Class
0-8-2T locomotives
Railway locomotives introduced in 1911
Standard gauge steam locomotives of Great Britain
Scrapped locomotives
Freight locomotives